The second cabinet of Manolache Costache Epureanu was the government of Romania from 27 April 1876 to 23 July 1876.

Ministers
The ministers of the cabinet were as follows:

President of the Council of Ministers:
Manolache Costache Epureanu (27 April - 23 July 1876)
Minister of the Interior: 
George Vernescu (27 April - 23 July 1876)
Minister of Foreign Affairs: 
Mihail Kogălniceanu (27 April - 23 July 1876)
Minister of Finance:
Ion C. Brătianu (27 April - 23 July 1876)
Minister of Justice:
Mihail Pherekyde (27 April - 23 July 1876)
Minister of War:
Col. Gheorghe Slăniceanu (27 April - 23 July 1876)
Minister of Religious Affairs and Public Instruction:
Gheorghe Chițu (27 April - 23 July 1876)
Minister of Public Works:
Manolache Costache Epureanu (27 April - 23 July 1876)

References

Cabinets of Romania
Cabinets established in 1876
Cabinets disestablished in 1876
1876 establishments in Romania
1876 disestablishments in Romania